EFAS may refer to:
 Eco Friendly Acoustic Solution
 European Federation of Autonomic Societies
 European Flood Awareness System
 Enroute Flight Advisory Service, an advisory system for aircraft in flight, termed Flight watch in the United States

See also 
 EFA (disambiguation)